Khmer Mekong Films (KMF) is a major Cambodian film and television production company based in Phnom Penh, the capital city of Cambodia. Founded by Matthew Robinson, a former director and executive producer of the BBC television series Byker Grove and EastEnders, KMF aims to help develop the Cambodian film industry, which was left moribund after the country was devastated by the Cambodian Civil War (1967–75), the Khmer Rouge regime (1975–79) and occupation by Vietnam (1979–89).

History

Khmer Mekong Films grew out of the team created and trained by the BBC in 2004 to make a 100-episode TV drama about HIV for Cambodian television. Taste of Life was funded by the UK government through the Department for International Development and managed by the  BBC World Service Trust. With funding finished in 2006, producer Matthew Robinson stayed in Cambodia to form KMF with the Taste of Life Khmer production team.

KMF has produced dozens of television dramas, documentaries, information films, educational films, television commercials and public service TV spots. The company has also produced nine Cambodian cinema films, Staying Single When (2007), Vanished (2009), Palace of Dreams (2010), the three-part Day in the Country (2015-2019), Price of Love (2016), King Selfie (2017), Fear (2018), Move Out (2019) and 360 Degrees (2019). A tenth movie, Dance Till You Drop, had to be abandoned halfway through shooting in March 2020 due to the dangers to cast and crew of COVID-19.

Filmography

Awards
In 2015/16 the first part of Day in the Country won a number of awards at four international film festivals: Hollywood International Moving Pictures Film Festival; Los Angeles International Film Festival; New York City Indie Film Awards (including 'Best Actor' and second Best Foreign Feature Film); and the Canada International Film Festival. In 2015 at the fourth Cambodian National Film Festival, Vanished won an award for 'Second Best Film' as well as 'Best Sound'. In 2016 Price of Love won four awards at the Hollywood International Moving Pictures Film Festival. In 2017 at the fifth Cambodian National Film Festival, Price of Love won four top awards including 'Best Film', 'Best Actress' and 'Best Production'.

Television

TV Series 
 Peep (2007)
 Peep 2 (2009)
 Upside Down (2009)
 AirWaves (2010)
 Upside Down 2 (2010)
 Beauty of Life (2011)
 My Family My Heart (2011)
 Impostors (2012)
 The Promise (2012)
 Smart Girls (2014)
 The Jade Elephant (2014)

TV Films 
 Power of Change (2008)
 Saving Seca (2009)
 Saving Seca Part Two (2010)

References

External links 
Khmer Mekong Films website
Khmer Mekong Films in Time magazine
Vanished review in Hollywood's 'Variety' 
Vanished review in  Cambodia's 'Phnom Penh Post'
Vanished information on Khmer Mekong Films website
Staying Single When information on Khmer Mekong Films website
BBC World Service Trust

Cinema of Cambodia